The 1993–94 Asian Club Championship was the 13th edition of the annual international club football competition held in the AFC region (Asia). It determined that year's club champion of association football in Asia.

Thai Farmers Bank FC from Thailand won that final and become Asian champions for the first time.

Preliminary round

West Asia

|}

East Asia

|}

South-East Asia

|}
1 Pahang FA withdrew.

First round

West Asia

|}

Central Asia

|}
1 The match was played over one leg due to civil unrest in Pakistan. 
2 Abahani KC withdrew.

East Asia

|}

South-East Asia

|}

Quarterfinals

 Al-Shabab and  Victory SC withdrew.

All matches were played at Supachalasai National Stadium in Bangkok, Thailand.

Group 1

Group 2

Semifinals

Third place match

Final

References
Asian Club Competitions 1993/94 at RSSSF.com

1994 in Asian football
1993 in Asian football
1993–94